The House of Commons Disqualification Act 1975 is an Act of the Parliament of the United Kingdom that prohibits certain categories of people from becoming members of the House of Commons. It is an updated version of similar older acts, known collectively by the stock short title House of Commons Disqualification Act.

The groups disqualified from all constituencies are:
 Lords Spiritual
 judges
 civil servants
 serving regular members of the armed forces, except Admirals of the Fleet, Field Marshals and Marshals of the Royal Air Force
 full-time police constables
 members of legislatures of non-Commonwealth countries, other than Ireland
 holders of certain administrative and diplomatic offices
 all members of certain bodies, such as tribunals and government departments, plus some statutory corporations such as Channel 4

Lords Lieutenant and High Sheriffs are also disqualified from seats for constituencies within their area.

Section 2 limits the number of government officials (specifically, holders of offices listed in Schedule 2) in the House of Commons at any one time to 95. Any appointed above that limit are forbidden to vote until the number is reduced to 95.

Section 4 effectively adds the Crown Stewards and Bailiffs of the Chiltern Hundreds and of the Manor of Northstead to Part III to Schedule 1, thus naming them as offices whose holders are disqualified. These offices are sinecures, used in modern times to effect resignation from the House of Commons. Prior to 1926, this disqualification was due to them being "offices of profit under the Crown", but that disqualification was abolished in 1926 and by s. 1(4) of this Act.

The election to the Commons of a disqualified person is invalid, and the seat of an MP who becomes disqualified is vacated immediately (triggering a by-election). The Privy Council has jurisdiction to determine whether a purported MP is disqualified; the issue may be tried in the High Court, Court of Session or High Court of Northern Ireland as appropriate for the constituency.

Amendments 
This Act was amended by subsequent legislation:
 The Disqualifications Act 2000, a consequence of the Good Friday Agreement, added the words "other than Ireland", prior to which Irish legislators were disqualified just as any other foreign legislators are. This was to bring them in line with treatment of Commonwealth legislators; however,  no one has taken advantage of this privilege.
 Previously, all  ministers of the Church of Scotland, priests, and deacons were disqualified. The House of Commons (Removal of Clergy Disqualification) Act 2001 restricted this disqualification to only Lords Spiritual, i.e. the most senior Anglican bishops who already sit in the House of Lords ex officio.
 Various enactments have amended the lists of disqualified bodies and offices, particularly as they have come in or out of existence or fallen out of government control.
 The Representation of the People Act 1981 provides for the automatic disqualification of parliamentary candidates or expulsion of sitting MPs if they serve an imprisonment of over a year. The nomination of a disqualified candidate is voided. The election of such a candidate or the re-election of an MP thus imprisoned will also be voided, leading to a by-election in their constituency.
 The Wales Act 2014 and Northern Ireland (Miscellaneous Provisions) Act 2014 respectively made members of the Senedd Cymru (Welsh Parliament), formerly the National Assembly for Wales until May 2020, or the Northern Ireland Assembly ineligible for the House of Commons.

External links
Text of the Act, original and amendments

United Kingdom Acts of Parliament 1975
Constitutional laws of the United Kingdom
Acts of the Parliament of the United Kingdom concerning the House of Commons